Vârfuri is a commune in Dâmbovița County, Muntenia, Romania, with a population of 1,842 people. It is composed of seven villages: Cârlănești, Cojoiu, Merișoru, Stătești, Șuvița, Ulmetu, and Vârfuri. It is located outside the town of Pucioasa.

History
In the years right around 1800, the commune's village was called Vârfu, a name that emerged from a census of Dâmbovița County, carried out in 1810 and which states "Vârfu village has 45 houses, 60 men and 82 women".

Then, the Vârfu name turned into Vârfuri. This name was mentioned in the "List of Candidates' Rights and Buildings", and this name kept. In some documents found in the State Archives – Prefect Fund as: "Rural Reform in 1864", "General Budget 1919–1920", the name of the village is "Vârfuri". The name "Vârfuri" is also mentioned in the "Geography of Dâmbovița County" in 1887, which describes the commune as follows:

At the end of the 19th century, the Vârfurile commune was part of the Ialomița-Dâmbovița lands of Dâmbovița County and it consisted of Peflori, Valea Rea, Cojoiu, Carlănești, Strâmbu, and Șuvița, with 1,300 inhabitants. A church and a school functioned in the commune.

In 1925, the Socec Yearbook added to the commune the village of Stătești, a commune with 2,531 inhabitants and assigned to the Pucioasa lands of the same county. In 1931, the village was composed of Cârlănești, Cojoiu, Stătești, Șuvița, Valea Rea, and Vârfuri villages.

In 1950, the commune passed under the administration of the Pucioasa raion of Prahova Region and then (after 1952) the Târgoviște raion in the Ploiești Region. In 1964, the Strâmbu village was named Ulmetu, and the village of Valea Rea was renamed Merișoru. In 1968, the commune returned to  the re-established Dâmbovița County.

References

Communes in Dâmbovița County
Localities in Muntenia